Poireaux vinaigrette is a dish of marinated leeks from French cuisine. It's a classic French dish still served at traditional cafes and bistros. To prepare the dish a vinaigrette with mustard is served over boiled leeks. The dish is sometimes garnished with chopped parsley and hard-boiled egg, and served with smoked salmon.

References

French cuisine
Vinegar
Mustard (condiment)
Leek dishes